Nails (also known as Gvozdi) is a 2003 Russian psychological horror film directed and produced by . The film stars Andrey Iskanov, Svyatoslav Iliyasov, Chisato Morishita, Irina Nikitina and Alexander Shevchenko in the lead roles.

Cast

References

External links
 

2000s Russian-language films
2003 films
2003 horror films
Russian horror drama films
2000s horror drama films